David Abraham Cheulkar (21 June 1909 – 2 January 1982), popularly known as David, was an Indian Hindi film actor. In a career spanning four decades, he played mostly character roles, starting with the 1941 film Naya Sansar, and went on to act in over 110 films, including memorable films such as Gol Maal (1979), Baton Baton Mein (1979) and Boot Polish (1954), for which he was awarded the 1955 Filmfare Best Supporting Actor Award.

Early and personal life
He was a member of Mumbai's Marathi-speaking Bene Israel community. David graduated from the University of Mumbai with a Bachelor of Arts degree in 1930. After a six-year unsuccessful struggle to land a job, he decided to try his luck in the Hindi film industry by becoming a professional actor. During these years of struggle, he also managed to obtain a degree in law from the Government Law College.

Finally, on 15 January 1937, with the help of his close friend Nayampalli, a veteran character actor, he landed his first role in a movie. The movie was Zambo, and it was being produced and directed by Mohan Bhavnani, who was the Chief Producer of the Films Division of the Government of India.

He never married.

Career
David was actively associated with IPTA, a theatre organization, and went on to be part of many Khwaja Ahmad Abbas's films, including Palme d'Or nominee Pardesi (1957), and Shehar Aur Sapna (1963), which won the  1964 National Film Award for Best Feature Film, Munaa and Char Dil Char Raahein.

Strongly associated with avuncular roles, David is best known for his portrayal of "John Chacha"  in the 1954 hit and Filmfare Award for Best Film winner and Palme d'Or nominee, Boot Polish, directed by Prakash Arora, for which he won the 1955 Filmfare Best Supporting Actor Award. The song "Nanhe Munne Bachche" from the film, picturized on him became a memorable song of that era.

In his prime, in the period 1959 to 1975, David was one of the best and the most well-known anchor, compere and the host of the prominent award shows and other functions. In one of the speeches of Jawaharlal Nehru, the prime minister, said that any of the events will be surely be incomplete without David's speech.

He was involved in promoting sports, and later became India's Olympic Games representative. He was awarded the Padma Shri award in 1969 by the Government of India.

Often billed as simply David or Uncle David, Cheulkar appeared in more than 110 Bollywood films in a career that exceeded four decades, many of them indeed as a kindly, avuncular character. Among his more notable performances were his roles in Boot Polish (1954), in which he played John Chacha, a kindly bootlegger who, before he is sent off to jail, takes two orphan siblings under his wing and teaches them to work for a living shining shoes, rather than to get by begging. Cheulkar received the Filmfare magazine best supporting actor prize for that role.

He was also featured in Pardesi (Journey Beyond Three Seas), a 1957 Russian-Indian coproduction taking place in the 1400s; The City and the Dream (Shehar Aur Sapna, in Hindi), a naturalistic urban drama from 1963, that was nominated for Indias National Film Award as best feature, and the romantic comedy Chupke Chupke from 1975 (from minute 1 to minute 2 of clip).

In the 1969 film Satyakam, Cheulkar was given the opportunity to play against type, taking the role of Rustom, a debauched drunkard who serves as a foil to the hero of the film, a family drama that takes place during the final days of British rule in India, in 1947.

According to Bentsion Abraham Chewoolkar, who wrote an essay about his relation Uncle David, on the centenary of the latters birth, Cheulkar, though not religiously devout, prayed briefly each day, and always observed Yom Kippur by fasting and by visiting synagogue for the Neilah service.

Death 
He died on 2 January 1982 in Toronto, Ontario, Canada of a heart attack at the age of 72.

Selected filmography

 Gehri Chot - Urf: Durdesh (1983) – Released after his death. Canada, Bangladesh, India joint production.
 Sumbandh (1982) – Released after his death.
 Khubsoorat (1980)
 Gol Maal (1979)
 Baton Baton Mein (1979)
 Hamare Tumhare (1979)
 Satyam Shivam Sundaram (1978) – Bade Babu
 Khatta Meetha (1978)
 Shatranj Ke Khilari (1977)
 Close Encounters of the Third Kind (1977)
 Kotwal Saab (1977)
 Dus Numbri (1976) – Pascal
 Chori Mera Kaam (1975) as John
 Chupke Chupke (1975)
 Abhimaan (1973)
 Anuraag (1972)
  Kal Aaj aur kal (1971)
 Jwala (1971)
 Nanak Naam Jahaz Hai (1969)
 Satyakam (1969)
 Ek Phool Do Maali (1969)
 Samay Bada Balwan (1969)
 Sapnon Ka Saudagar (1968)
 Mere Huzoor  (1968)
 Bambai Raat Ki Bahon Mein (1967)
 Upkar (1967)
  Suraj (1966)
 Aasra (1966)
 Anupama (1966)
 Mamta (1966)
 Himalaya Ki God Mein (1965)
 Sangeet Samrat Tansen (1962)
 Ek Phool Char Kaante (1960)
 Return of Mr. Superman (Mr. Superman ki Wapsi) (1960)
 Santan (1959)
 Amar Deep (1958)
 Pardesi (1957)
 Bhai Bhai (1956)
 Boot Polish (1954)
 Rahi (1952)
 Hamara Ghar (1950)
 Sawan Aya Re (1949)
 Actress (1948)
 Insaaf (1946 film) (1946)
 Nargis (1946)
 Ghulami (1945 film) (1945)
 Insaan (1944)
 Tasveer (1943)
 Kismet (1943) 
 Anjaan (1941)
 Naya Sansar (1941)
 Zambo (1937)

Awards and recognition
 1969: Received the Padma Shri award in 1969 by the Government of India.

References

External links
 

Bene Israel
Indian male film actors
Indian male stage actors
Male actors in Hindi cinema
Jewish male actors
1909 births
1981 deaths
Male actors from Mumbai
Indian People's Theatre Association people
Recipients of the Padma Shri in arts
20th-century Indian male actors
Jewish film people
Filmfare Awards winners
Indian Jews